The Aist is a river in Upper Austria, a left tributary of the Danube.

The Aist, Feldaist and Waldaist flow through the protected Natura 2000 site  (Fauna-Flora-Habitat Area).

History
The name "Aist" was derived from a Slavic river designation, recorded in ancient documents such as the Wilhelmine deed. Upper Austria, as well as many other parts of Europe, were at that time inhabited by Slavic peoples. The river appeared for the first time in 853 in a deed as "Agasta". In 983 it is called "Agesta". The prefix "ag" means "drive" or "fast". The name of Dietmar von Aist (1140–1171), a Minnesänger, may be related to the Aist.

In the August 2002 flood, the entire Aist area was devastated.

References

Rivers of Upper Austria
Rivers of Austria